Groarke is a surname. Notable people with the surname include:

 Leo Groarke (born 1953), Canadian philosopher, brother of Louis Groarke
 Louis Groarke (born 1953), Canadian philosopher, brother of Leo Groarke
 Nikki Groarke (born 1962), British Anglican priest 
 Raymond Groarke (born 1952), Irish judge
 Vona Groarke (born 1964), Irish poet

See also
 Groark (surname)